Uraz  is a village (former city) in the administrative district of Gmina Oborniki Śląskie, within Trzebnica County, Lower Silesian Voivodeship, in south-western Poland. As of 2011 it had a population of 949.

History
In the middle of the 13th century, there was a prince's stronghold in Uraz, managed by the castellan.

Landmarks

The main church, the Church of Archangel Michael, was mentioned in 1218. The present church was built in 1750–1789 in the Baroque style. It was restored in the 19th century, but burned down in 1945. It was subsequently rebuilt in 1951-1953 by the priest Franciszek Dorżyński. In 1970 a new interior with polychrome was added. In 1997, the church was flooded to a height of 40 cm. In the years 1997–2000 it was renovated. In the church there are sculptures brought by repatriates from Navaria, near Lviv. There is the ruins of a castle, Zamek Uraz, (Uraz Castle), dated to 1319, which was destroyed by the 1950s.

References

Uraz
Former populated places in Lower Silesian Voivodeship